The 1989 Pittsburgh Panthers football team represented the University of Pittsburgh in the 1989 NCAA Division I-A football season.

Schedule

Personnel

Season summary

Pacific

at Boston College

Syracuse

at West Virginia

at Temple

Navy

at Notre Dame

Miami (FL)

East Carolina

Penn State

vs Rutgers

John Hancock Bowl (vs Texas A&M)

Team players drafted into the NFL

References

Pittsburgh
Pittsburgh Panthers football seasons
Sun Bowl champion seasons
Pittsburgh Panthers football